The Samarkand Oblast was an oblast (province) of the Russian Empire between 1868 and 1924. It roughly corresponded to most of present-day central Uzbekistan and northwestern Tajikistan. It was created out of the northeastern part of Emirate of Bukhara. It consisted of the uyezds of Samarkand (incl. cities Samarkand and Pendzhikent), Dzhizak (incl. city Dzhizak), Katta-Kurgan (incl. city Katta-Kurgan) and Khodzhent (incl. cities Khodzhent and Uratyube).

Demographics
As of 1897, 860,021 people populated the oblast. Uzbeks constituted the majority of the population. Significant minorities consisted of Tajiks and Kazakhs. Turkic speaking population amounted to 609,204 (70,8%) people.

Ethnic groups in 1897

Russian Revolution
On April 30, 1918, the region became a part of Turkestan ASSR. On October 27, 1924 as a result of the national-territorial reorganisation of Central Asia, the Samarkand region became a part of the Uzbek SSR of the Soviet Union.

References

Further reading
 

 
Oblasts of the Russian Empire
Central Asia in the Russian Empire
States and territories established in 1868
States and territories disestablished in 1924